Lo-Pro is the debut studio album of Lo-Pro, released on September 30, 2003. It had one single in "Sunday" which garnered considerable radio play upon release. Throughout 2003 and 2004, Lo-Pro toured with groups like Staind and Three Days Grace in promotion of the album before being dropped from their record label.

Background

Singer Pete Murray and guitarist Neil Godfrey had previously played together in the band Ultraspank. After releasing 2 albums in 1998 and 2000, the band split up in 2001. Burned out and disillusioned, everyone parted ways to do their own thing. However, Murray and Godfrey eventually got back together with making music. Godfrey summed it up as:
 
During the Spank progression Pete M. had always been doing his best to record stuff, keeping up on technology updates. By the end of that time he was getting really good with Pro-Tools. So I think about 2 or 3 weeks went by and I'd been playing my guitar. I called up Pete and said I had some ideas to lay down.The Spank guys were all going in different directions. With the pressures of the industry gone and the freedom to do anything I wanted, we started writing songs. The result was so refreshing in the fact that we could record ourselves and make these great sounding recordings we could listen to.

The demos they created in these sessions were the starting point for the album. Eventually, they were able to gain the attention of Aaron Lewis, lead singer of the band Staind, and was signed to his vanity label, "413 Records", through  Geffen. Through this, they configured the rest of the band, and began work on the actual album, with producing being done by Aaron Lewis and Don Gilmore.

Release
The album was released on September 30, 2003. It peaked at no. 9 on the Billboard Top Heatseekers chart, and stayed on the chart for two weeks. One single, "Sunday", was released from the album, and while it did receive moderate radio airplay, another single was never released, and the band was later dropped from the label in mid-2004.

Murray later would express a number of regrets on the album, ranging from it being "over-produced"  to not releasing "Oblivion" as a single.

Track listing

Known "homemade" demos
These are songs known to have been worked on by Pete Murray and Neil Godfrey when they were creating demos in one of their homes:

Single charts

Personnel
Pete Murray - vocals, programming
Neil Godfrey - guitar
Pete Ricci - guitar
John Fahnestock - bass
Tommy Stewart - drums

Additional personnel
Gayle Boulware - handclapping

References

2003 debut albums
Lo-Pro albums
Geffen Records albums